Dance Tonight! Revolution Tomorrow! is the second studio album by American screamo band Orchid. It was released on 10" vinyl by Ebullition Records on December 4, 2000. The first press was limited to 5000 copies; 1000 each in red and yellow and 3000 in black. The second and third presses were limited to only 1000 clear copies and 70 blue copies. The fourth press had 1000 blue copies, 500 yellow copies, and 500 red copies. The entire album was also included on a 2002 compilation album that combined the album with Chaos Is Me.

Track listing

Personnel
Orchid
 Geoff Garlock – bass guitar
 Jayson Green – lead vocals
 Jeffrey Salane – drums
 Will Killingsworth – guitar

Additional personnel
 Kurt Ballou – recording engineer, producer
 Molly Sugarman – violin on track 10
 Will Killingsworth – recording engineer for the violin

References

External links
 

2000 albums
Ebullition Records albums
Albums produced by Kurt Ballou
Orchid (screamo band) albums